The 2022 season was the Seattle Seahawks' 47th in the National Football League (NFL) and their 13th under the head coach/general manager tandem of Pete Carroll and John Schneider. 

For the first time since 2011, quarterback Russell Wilson and linebacker Bobby Wagner were not on the roster, as Wilson was traded to the Denver Broncos and Wagner was released and later signed with the Los Angeles Rams. Both were the last remaining players from their Super Bowl-winning season on the roster. Subsequently, Bruce Irvin, who played in two Super Bowls with the Seahawks, signed with the team for a third stint. 

The Seahawks improved on their 7–10 record from the previous year after a Week 17 win over the New York Jets. In the final week of the regular season, Seattle earned a winning record with a victory over the Los Angeles Rams, their division rivals who they managed to sweep for the first time since the 2013 season, and claimed the final NFC wild-card berth with the Detroit Lions subsequent victory over the Green Bay Packers, making the playoffs after a one year absence. The win was the 400th career win (regular season and playoffs) in Seahawks history. 

In the playoffs, the Seahawks faced their rival the San Francisco 49ers in the Wild Card round. Despite leading at the end of the first half, they would eventually be defeated 41–23 and failed to advance to the Divisional Round.

In a scheduling coincidence, the Seahawks began the post-Russell Wilson era, by beating the Russell Wilson-led Broncos.

Draft

Draft trades

Staff

Final roster
<noinclude>

Preseason
The Seahawks' preseason opponents and schedule was announced in the spring.

Regular season

Schedule
On May 4, the NFL announced that the Seahawks would play the Tampa Bay Buccaneers during Week 10 on November 13 at Allianz Arena in Munich, Germany, as part of the league's International Series. It was the first-ever regular season game played in Germany. The game kicked off at 3:30 p.m. CET/6:30 a.m. PST, televised by the NFL Network, with the Buccaneers serving as the home team.

Note: Intra-division opponents are in bold text.

Game summaries

Week 1: vs. Denver Broncos

Week 2: at San Francisco 49ers

Week 3: vs. Atlanta Falcons

Week 4: at Detroit Lions

This game ultimately ended up determining the 7th seed in the playoff race, which Seattle clinched due to holding tiebreaker over the Lions thanks to this game

Week 5: at New Orleans Saints

Week 6: vs. Arizona Cardinals

Week 7: at Los Angeles Chargers

Week 8: vs. New York Giants

Week 9: at Arizona Cardinals

Week 10: at Tampa Bay Buccaneers
NFL International Series

Week 12: vs. Las Vegas Raiders

Week 13: at Los Angeles Rams

With the win, the Seahawks defeated the Rams in Los Angeles for the first time since 2017.

Week 14: vs. Carolina Panthers

Week 15: vs. San Francisco 49ers

Week 16: at Kansas City Chiefs

Week 17: vs. New York Jets

Week 18: vs. Los Angeles Rams

Standings

Division

Conference

Postseason

Schedule

Game summaries

NFC Wild Card Playoffs: at (2) San Francisco 49ers

References

External links

Seattle
Seattle Seahawks seasons
Seattle Seahawks
Seattle Seahawks